Brzezieński Młyn is a settlement (colony) in the Pomeranian Voivodeship, Poland, within the Gmina Lipnica, Bytów County, in the sołectwo of Łąkie. It is located on the northern shore of the Gwiazda Lake, in the Bytowa Lake Region, within the cultural region of Gochy, part of Kashubia.

Notes

References 

Villages in Bytów County